Tribolet can refer to:
 Tribolet, an obscure troubadour, known only for one song
 José Tribolet (b. 1949), Portuguese computer scientist 
 Louis de Tribolet, Swiss Olympic fencer